Nicolás Massú was the defending champion, but he chose to not compete this year.
Guillaume Rufin won this tournament, after beating Pere Riba 6–4, 3–6, 6–3 in the final.

Seeds

Draw

Finals

Top half

Bottom half

References
 Main Draw
 Qualifying Draw

Cyclus Open de Tenis - Singles
2009 Singles
Cyc